John Henry Knox (26 July 1788 - 27 August 1872), was a Tory Member of the Parliament of the United Kingdom who represented the constituency of Newry from 1826 to 1832.

References

External links 
 

Tory MPs (pre-1834)
Members of the Parliament of the United Kingdom for Newry (1801–1918)
UK MPs 1826–1830
UK MPs 1830–1831
UK MPs 1831–1832
1788 births
1872 deaths